Sabin-Florin Strătilă (born 27 March 1995) is a rugby union full-back who plays for Steaua București and Romania.
Strătilă made his debut for the Romania in 2015 and was part of the squad at the 2015 Rugby World Cup.

Personal life
Sabin-Florin is the older brother of fellow Steaua teammate Damian Strătilă.

References

External links

Living people
1995 births
People from Constanța
Romanian rugby union players
Romania international rugby union players
CSA Steaua București (rugby union) players
Rugby union fullbacks